The 32d Air Division (32d AD) is an inactive United States Air Force organization.  It was last active with Air Defense Command, assigned to First Air Force at Gunter Air Force Base, Alabama, where it was inactivated on 31 December 1969.

The division was first activated by Continental Air Command in November 1949 at Stewart Air Force Base, New York.  It controlled air defense units in the northeastern United States from Stewart, and later from Hancock Field, New York until being inactivated in August 1958.

The division was activated again in November 1958 at Dobbins Air Force Base, Georgia to provide air defense of the southeastern United States, moving to Oklahoma City Air Force Station, Oklahoma in 1961.  During the Cuban Missile Crisis, it was the primary air defense command for potential attacks from Cuba, acting through its Montgomery Air Defense Sector and a provisional organization at Key West Naval Air Station.  The division was inactivated in September 1963.

In April 1966, the 32d was again activated at Gunter, where it replaced the Montgomery Air Defense Sector.  At Gunter, it also reported to North American Air Defense Command (NORAD) as the 32d NORAD Region.  It was again responsible for air defense in the Southeast until 1969, when its mission, personnel and equipment were transferred to the 20th Air Division.

History

Air Defense of the Northeast

Assigned to Air Defense Command (ADC) for most of its existence, the 32d organized, administered, equipped, trained, and prepared for operation, all of its assigned units. The division participated in exercises such as Creek Brave, Top Rung and Natchez Echo. Initially, it assumed responsibility for an area including Maine, Vermont, Massachusetts, New Hampshire, and part of New York.

Cuban Missile Crisis
During the Cuban Missile Crisis, as the division responsible for defense of the area nearest Cuba, the division role expanded.  In addition to defense of its area of responsibility, the division (acting largely through its Montgomery Air Defense Sector and Task Force 32, which was established for Continental Air Defense Command and included an operating location at Key West Naval Air Station, Florida) was responsible to defend staging bases and routes to possible drop zones in Cuba for troop carrier units.

Radar warning capabilities were increased. The number of Lockheed EC-121 Warning Star airborne early warning and control aircraft at McCoy Air Force Base, Florida was increased from three to six. On 24 October VAW-14 deployed six Grumman WF-2s to Jacksonville Naval Air Station. These planes moved to Key West on 26 October.

At the same time additional interceptor aircraft were put under the division's control.  Initially, the aircraft of the training wing at Tyndall Air Force Base, Florida were put on alert at Tyndall and other Florida bases, as was a detachment of VF(AW)-3 at Key West. The Tyndall forces included 17 McDonnell F-101 Voodoos, 18 Convair F-106 Delta Darts and 9 Convair F-102 Delta Daggers, and were the main element in increasing the ADC alert force in Florida from 4 to 74 planes in 48 hours. TF-102 trainers were placed on alert at Homestead, Patrick, McCoy, and MacDill. The Navy fighter detachment was also transferred to the division's control.

Twelve McDonnell F-4 Phantom IIs of VF-41 moved to augment air defense forces on Key West, and additional crews were added to the VF(AW)-3 detachment to permit it to maintain aircraft on continuous alert. The 331st Fighter-Interceptor Squadron deployed 18 Delta Daggers to Homestead Air Force Base bringing the number of Deuces there to 32. However, the F-102s of the 331st were soon replaced with F-102s from 325th Fighter-Interceptor Squadron in order to have planes armed with Mighty Mouse rockets to improve low altitude intercept capability Patrick Air Force Base, Florida received a dozen Delta Darts from the 49th Fighter-Interceptor Squadron.

To improve fighter-on-fighter capability draft mobilization orders were issued for the 122d, 151st, 157th and 159th Fighter-Interceptor Squadrons, but were never finalized and the Air National Guard did not take part in the crisis. The alert status of the division's fighters included airborne alert against dawn raids early in crisis. The "Strategic Orbit Points" for airborne fighters were manned by 10 planes (later reduced to 4 planes). Alert planes were also placed in "sling shot" status (engines running).  This was later reduced to alert crews in the planes' cockpit near the runway.

Army air defense forces also came under the division's control.  A battery of MIM-23 Hawk missiles from the 6th Battalion, 61st Artillery was transferred from Fort Meade to defend Key West. Homestead received a 40mm automatic weapons battery from the 1st Battalion, 59th Artillery and on 31 October. a Nike Hercules battery from the 2nd Battalion, 52nd Artillery at Fort Bliss as well as a Hawk batteries on 2 November. Hawks from the 8th Battalion, 15th Artillery at Fort Lewis were also deployed to MacDill Air Force Base and to Patrick.

As the crisis eased, most units were released on 29 November, and except for forces retained against possible future threats from Cuba, the remaining forces were returned to their normal status by 3 December.

Air defense of the Southeast

Later, beginning in 1966, the area expanded to include Mississippi, Alabama, Georgia, and parts of South Carolina, Louisiana and Florida when it assumed responsibility for the mission of the inactivated Montgomery Air Defense Sector.  Assumed additional designation of 32d NORAD Region after activation of the NORAD Combat Operations Center at the Cheyenne Mountain Complex, Colorado and reporting was transferred to NORAD from ADC at Ent Air Force Base in April 1966.

Inactivated in November 1969 as ADC phased down its interceptor mission as the chances of a Soviet bomber attack on the United States seemed remote, its mission being consolidated into the 23d Air Division.

Lineage
 Established as 32d Air Division (Defense) on 8 November 1949
 Activated on 8 December 1949
 Inactivated on 1 February 1952
 Organized on 1 February 1952
 Inactivated on 15 August 1958
 Redesignated 32d Air Division (SAGE) on 21 October 1958
 Activated on 15 November 1958
 Discontinued and inactivated, on 4 September 1963
 Redesignated 32d Air Division and activated on 20 January 1966 (not organized)
 Organized on 1 April 1966
 Inactivated on 31 December 1969

Assignments
 First Air Force, 8 December 1949
 Eastern Air Defense Force, 1 September 1950 – 1 February 1952.
 Eastern Air Defense Force, 1 February 1952 – 15 August 1958
 Eastern Air Defense Force, 15 November 1958
 Air Defense Command, 1 August 1959 – 4 September 1963
 Air Defense Command, 20 January 1966
 Fourteenth Air Force, 1 April 1966
 First Air Force, 1 July 1968 – 31 December 1969

Stations
 Stewart Air Force Base, New York, 8 December 1949 – 12 February 1952
 Hancock Field (later Syracuse Air Force Station), New York, 12 February 1952 – 15 August 1958
 Dobbins Air Force Base, Georgia, 15 November 1958
 Oklahoma City Air Force Station, Oklahoma, 1 August 1961 – 4 September 1963
 Gunter Air Force Base, Alabama, 1 April 1966 – 31 December 1969.

Components

Sectors
 Bangor Air Defense Sector: 8 January 1957 – 15 August 1958
 Topsham Air Force Station, Maine
 Montgomery Air Defense Sector: 15 November 1958 – 1 July 1963
 Gunter Air Force Station, Alabama
 Oklahoma City Air Defense Sector (Manual): 1 July – 1 September 1961
 Oklahoma City Air Force Station, Oklahoma
 Syracuse Air Defense Sector
 Syracuse Air Force Station, New York

Wings

 33d Fighter-Interceptor Wing: attached 20 February 1950 – 1 February 1952
 Otis Air Force Base, Massachusetts
 4624th Air Defense Wing (later Syracuse Air Defense Sector): 1 October 1956 – 15 August 1958
 Syracuse Air Force Station, New York
 4707th Defense (later 4707th Air Defense Wing): 16 February 1953 – 1 March 1956
 Niagara Falls Municipal Airport, New York

 4711th Defense Wing (later 4711th Air Defense Wing): 16 February 1953 – 1 March 1956
 Presque Isle Air Force Base, Maine
 4752d Air Defense Wing: 1 September 1961 – 25 June 1963
 Oklahoma City Air Force Station, Oklahoma

Groups

 14th Fighter Group: 1 March 1956 – August 1958
 Ethan Allen Air Force Base, Vermont
 23d Fighter Group: 1 March 1956 – 1 August 1958
 Presque Isle Air Force Base, Maine

 540th Aircraft Control and Warning Group, 1 January 1951 – 6 February 1952
 4727th Air Defense Group: 8 February 1957 – 1 August 1958
 Griffiss Air Force Base, New York

Interceptor squadrons

 27th Fighter-Interceptor Squadron: 1 March 1956 – 8 February 1957
 Griffiss Air Force Base, New York
 49th Fighter-Interceptor Squadron: 16 June 1956 – 1 August 1958
 Hanscom Field, Massachusetts
 76th Fighter-Interceptor Squadron: 15 November 1958 – 1 February 1961
 Pinecastle Air Force Base (later McCoy Air Force Base), Florida
 319th Fighter-Interceptor Squadron: 1 April 1966 – 31 December 1969
 Homestead Air Force Base, Florida

 444th Fighter-Interceptor Squadron: 15 November 1958 – 1 July 1961
 Charleston Air Force Base, South Carolina
 465th Fighter-Interceptor Squadron: 1 March 1956 – 8 February 1957
 Griffiss Air Force Base, New York
 482d Fighter-Interceptor Squadron: 15 November 1958 – 1 July 1961
 Seymour Johnson Air Force Base, North Carolina

Radar squadrons

 609th Radar Squadron
 Eufaula Air Force Station, Alabama, 15 November 1958 – 1 November 1959; 1 April 1966 – 8 September 1968
 614th Radar Squadron
 Cherry Point Marine Corps Air Station, North Carolina, 1 December 1952 – 16 February 1953; 15 November 1958 – 1 July 1961
 627th Radar Squadron
 Crystal Springs Air Force Station, Mississippi, 15 November 1958 – 1 November 1959; 1 April 1966 – 8 September 1968
 644th Radar Squadron
 Richmond Air Force Station, Florida, 1 April 1966 – 14 November 1969
 645th Radar Squadron
 Patrick Air Force Base, Florida, 1 April 1966 – 14 November 1969
 654th Aircraft Control and Warning Squadron
 Brunswick Air Force Station, Maine, 6 February 1952 – 16 February 1956; 1 March 1956 – 15 August 1958
 655th Aircraft Control and Warning Squadron
 Watertown Air Force Station, New York, 6 February 1952 – 16 February 1953; 1 March 1956 – 1 September 1958
 657th Radar Squadron
 Houma Air Force Station, Louisiana, 15 November 1958 – 1 November 1959; 1 April 1966 – 14 November 1969
 660th Radar Squadron
 MacDill Air Force Base, Florida, 15 November 1958 – 1 November 1959; 1 April 1966 – 14 November 1969
 663d Aircraft Control and Warning Squadron
 Lake City Air Force Station, Tennessee, 15 November 1958 – 1 June 1961
 671st Radar Squadron
 Key West Naval Air Station, Florida, 1 April 1966 – 14 November 1969
 672d Aircraft Control and Warning Squadron
 Barrington Air Station, Nova Scotia, 1 December 1956 – 15 August 1958
 678th Radar Squadron
 Tyndall Air Force Base, Florida, 1 April 1966 – 14 November 1969
 679th Radar Squadron
 Jacksonville Naval Air Station, Florida, 15 November 1958 – 1 November 1959; 1 April 1966 – 14 November 1969
 691st Radar Squadron
 Cross City Air Force Station, Florida, 15 November 1958 – 1 November 1959; 1 April 1966 – 14 November 1969
 693d Radar Squadron
 Dauphin Island Air Force Station, Alabama, 15 November 1958 – 1 November 1959; 1 April 1966 – 14 November 1969
 698th Radar Squadron
 Thomasville Air Force Station, Alabama, 15 November 1958 – 1 November 1959; 1 April 1966 – 31 December 1969

 702d Radar Squadron
 Savannah Air Force Station, Georgia, 1 April 1966 – 14 November 1969
 762d Aircraft Control and Warning Squadron
 North Truro Air Force Station, Massachusetts, 6 February 1952 – 16 February 1953
 763d Aircraft Control and Warning Squadron
 Lockport Air Force Station, New York, 6 February 1952 – 16 February 1953
 764th Aircraft Control and Warning Squadron
 Saint Albans Air Force Station, Vermont, 1 March 1956 – 15 August 1958
 765th Aircraft Control and Warning Squadron
 Charleston Air Force Station, Maine, 1 March 1956 – 15 August 1958
 766th Aircraft Control and Warning Squadron
 Caswell Air Force Station, Maine, 1 March 1956 – 15 August 1958
 783d Aircraft Control and Warning Squadron
 Guthrie Air Force Station, West Virginia, 15 November 1958 – 1 June 1961
 784th Aircraft Control and Warning Squadron
 Snow Mountain Air Force Station, Kentucky, 15 November 1958 – 1 June 1961
 792d Aircraft Control and Warning Squadron
 North Charleston Air Force Station, South Carolina, 1 November 24 December 1953; 15 November 1958 – 1 July 1961
 799th Aircraft Control and Warning Squadron
 Joelton Air Force Station, Tennessee, 15 November 1958 – 1 June 1961
 810th Aircraft Control and Warning Squadron
 Winston-Salem Air Force Station, North Carolina, 15 November 1958 – 1 July 1961
 861st Radar Squadron
 Aiken Air Force Station, South Carolina, 15 November 1958 – 1 July 1961; 1 April 1966 – 14 November 1969
 867th Aircraft Control and Warning Squadron
 Flintstone Air Force Station, Georgia, 15 November 1958 – 25 July 1960
 908th Radar Squadron
 Marietta Air Force Station, Georgia, 15 November 1958 – 1 July 1961; 1 April 1966 – 8 September 1968
 911th Aircraft Control and Warning Squadron
 Lyndonville Air Force Station, Vermont, 1 March 1956 – 15 August 1958
 912th Aircraft Control and Warning Squadron
 Ramore Air Station, Ontario, 10 March 1952 – 21 December 1952
 913th Aircraft Control and Warning Squadron
 Pagwa Air Station, Ontario, 10 March 1952 – 20 December 1952
 915th Aircraft Control and Warning Squadron
 Sioux Lookout Air Station, Ontario, 10 March 1952 – 16 December 1952
 916th Aircraft Control and Warning Squadron
 Beausejour Air Station, Manitoba, 12 February-1 December 1952

See also
 List of USAF Aerospace Defense Command General Surveillance Radar Stations
 Aerospace Defense Command Fighter Squadrons
 List of United States Air Force air divisions

References

Notes

Bibliography

 McMullen, Richard F. (1964) "The Fighter Interceptor Force 1962-1964"  ADC Historical Study No. 27, Air Defense Command, Ent Air Force Base, CO (Confidential, declassified 22 Mar 2000)
 NORAD/CONAD Participation in the Cuban Missile Crisis, Historical Reference Paper No. 8, Directorate of Command History Continental Air Defense Command, Ent AFB, CO, 1 Feb 63 (Top Secret NOFORN, declassified 9 March 1996), p. 2

 Further reading
 Winkler, David F. (1997), Searching the skies: the legacy of the United States Cold War defense radar program. Prepared for United States Air Force Headquarters Air Combat Command.
  A Handbook of Aerospace Defense Organization 1946 - 1980, by Lloyd H. Cornett and Mildred W. Johnson, Office of History, Aerospace Defense Center, Peterson Air Force Base, Colorado
 Aerospace Defense Command publication, The Interceptor, January 1979 (Volume 21, Number 1)

Aerospace Defense Command units
032
1949 establishments in New York (state)
1969 disestablishments in Alabama